History of the World in Three Minutes Flat is a 1980 Canadian animated short film, directed by Michael Mills.

Summary
The film depicts a history of life on Earth, compressed into three minutes.

Accolades
This hugely successful film won a multitude of international awards. The film received a Genie Award nomination for Best Theatrical Short Film at the 2nd Genie Awards in 1981, and an Academy Award nomination for Best Animated Short Film at the 53rd Academy Awards. It won the award for Best Film Under Three Minutes at the 1980 Ottawa International Animation Festival, the Short Film Golden Bear at the 1981 Berlin Film Festival, a Golden Reel Award from the Canada Council's inaugural Canadian Short Films Showcase, and the American Film and Video Festival's Blue Ribbon Award.

See also
1980 in film
Evolution-the 1971 animated short also directed by Mills

References

External links
 
History of the World in Three Minutes Flat on YouTube
Letterboxd

1980 films
1980 animated films
Canadian animated short films
1980 short films
Cultural depictions of Adam and Eve
1980s English-language films
1980s Canadian films